Janneke Busser Kanis (born 15 February 1985) is a Dutch racing cyclist. She competed in the 2013 UCI women's team time trial in Florence.

See also
 2012 Team Skil-Argos season
2013 Team Argos-Shimano season

References

External links

Home page

1985 births
Living people
Dutch female cyclists
Sportspeople from Zwolle
Cyclists from Overijssel
21st-century Dutch women